André Guy Foreman De Vanny (born 14 September 1984) is an Australian actor, who starred in Wicked Science and  Swansong.

Filmography
Of Mice and Men (2015) as Curley
War Horse (2013)
The Pacific (2010) as Crazy Marine
Rush (2009) as Terry 'Flea' Hartigan
Canal Road (2008) as Danny Havesco
Nice Shootin' Cowboy (2008) as Will
Under a Red Moon (2008) as Zach
Nightmares and Dreamscapes: From the Stories of Stephen King (2006) (mini) TV Series as Skater Boy (segment 'You Know They Got a Hell of a Band')
Swing (2005) as Noah
Hercules (2005/I) (TV) as Young Iphicles
Hating Alison Ashley (2005) as Tom
Salem's Lot (2004) (TV) as Danny Glick
Wicked Science (2004) TV Series as Toby Johnson (52 episodes, 2003)
Blue Heelers as Marky Emmett (1 episode, Losing the Road, 2003) TV Episode, as Marky Emmett
MDA as Joshua Tranter (1 episode, 2003)
A Closer Walk (2003) TV Episode as Joshua Tranter

References

External links
 

1984 births
Living people
Australian male film actors
Australian male child actors
Australian male soap opera actors